Glamaig is the northernmost of the Red Hills on the Isle of Skye in Scotland. It lies immediately east of Sligachan. It is one of only two Corbetts on Skye.

From many angles the hill resembles a perfect cone of scree, though it is linked to the rest of the Red Hills by way of a bealach, the Bealach na Sgairde (pronounced b'ya-loch na skaar-st'ya), meaning the pass of scree.

In 1889, a Gurkha named Harkabir Tharpa scaled Glamaig in 37 minutes; his total time for the round trip, starting and finishing at sea level in the bar of the Sligachan Inn was 55 minutes. Legend has it that he ran it in bare feet, and his record stood until the 1980s, despite being attempted by Olympians such as Chris Brasher in the 1950s.

From Sligachan one route of ascent (whether running or hillwalking) is simply to head up the scree aiming for the summit - this climb is very arduous, due to the unrelenting gradient and the slipperiness of the scree. Descent may be made by way of ascent; alternatively one may continue along the Red Cuillin ridge to take in other peaks to the south.

A slightly less arduous (but longer) climb approaches the mountain from its eastern end at Sconser. Climb first to the secondary summit, An Coileach (The Cockerel), then follow the whaleback ridge to the primary summit, Sgurr Mhairi (Mary's Peak).

From the summit there are excellent views of both the Black Cuillin and the Isle of Raasay.

Glamaig Hill Race

Glamaig has been the site of an annual hill race since the 1980s. It begins and finishes at the Sligachan Hotel. While in distance terms a relatively short Category S race covering a distance of 7 km, with 775m of ascent it falls into a Category A climb, and is one of the more challenging races on the Scottish circuit.

External links
 Route of ascent on Walk Highlands
 Ascent route from Sconser on The Skye Guide
 Details of the Glamaig Hill Race

Corbetts
Marilyns of Scotland
Mountains and hills of the Isle of Skye